The following is a list of film- and television-related occupations.

Animation

Film-specific

Television-specific

Other

See also
Lists of occupations

References

Film

Television lists
Film-related lists